The decade of the 1060s in art involved some significant events.

Events

Paintings

 1061: Cui Bai paints "Double Happiness", also known as "Two Jays and a Hare"

Births

Deaths
 1064: Yi Yuanji – Chinese Northern Song painter famous for his realistic paintings of animals (born 1000)

Art
Years of the 11th century in art